Euchrysops sahelianus, the western brown-edged Cupid, is a butterfly in the family Lycaenidae. It is found in Senegal (Basse Casamance), Burkina Faso, Mali, Sierra Leone, Ghana and northern Nigeria. The habitat consists of Sudan savanna and Guinea savanna with short grass. It is mainly found in rocky areas with short grass.

References

Butterflies described in 2001
Euchrysops